Rasheed Dwyer (born 29 January 1989) is a Jamaican athlete specializing in the sprinting events. His two biggest successes to date are winning the gold in 200 metres at the 2011 Summer Universiade and also winning the gold (200 metres) at the 2014 Commonwealth Games. He studied at the G.C. Foster College in Spanish Town. Dwyer also represented Jamaica in the 200 metres at the 2020 Summer Olympics, placing seventh in the final.

Achievements

Personal bests
100 Metres – 10.10 (Kingston 2016)
200 Metres – 19.80 (Toronto 2015)

References

1989 births
Living people
Jamaican male sprinters
Commonwealth Games gold medallists for Jamaica
Athletes (track and field) at the 2010 Commonwealth Games
Athletes (track and field) at the 2014 Commonwealth Games
Athletes (track and field) at the 2018 Commonwealth Games
Athletes (track and field) at the 2015 Pan American Games
World Athletics Championships athletes for Jamaica
World Athletics Championships medalists
Commonwealth Games medallists in athletics
Pan American Games medalists in athletics (track and field)
Pan American Games silver medalists for Jamaica
Universiade medalists in athletics (track and field)
Central American and Caribbean Games silver medalists for Jamaica
Central American and Caribbean Games bronze medalists for Jamaica
Competitors at the 2010 Central American and Caribbean Games
Competitors at the 2018 Central American and Caribbean Games
Universiade gold medalists for Jamaica
Athletes (track and field) at the 2019 Pan American Games
World Athletics Championships winners
Central American and Caribbean Games medalists in athletics
Medalists at the 2011 Summer Universiade
Medalists at the 2013 Summer Universiade
Medalists at the 2015 Pan American Games
Athletes (track and field) at the 2020 Summer Olympics
Olympic athletes of Jamaica
20th-century Jamaican people
21st-century Jamaican people
Medallists at the 2010 Commonwealth Games
Medallists at the 2014 Commonwealth Games